Shenango Valley Mall is a shopping mall located in Hermitage, Pennsylvania. It is anchored by JCPenney.

History
The land Shenango Valley Mall sits on was previously owned by the McConnell family until it's sale in 2022. JCPenney opened at the mall in January 1969, after being previously located in Sharon, Pennsylvania. Shenango Valley Mall was renovated in 1997, costing $3.5 million. It was the malls first major renovation since opening in the 1960s and Kaufmann's also expanded its store. Crown American Realty Trust, the mall's owner, was sold to PREIT in 2003. The mall was then sold by PREIT, along with five others to The Lightstone Group in 2004. Kaufmann's was re-branded as Macy's in August 2006. Shenango Valley Mall and three other malls entered receivership in January 2009, with Jones Lang LaSalle taking over management. Jones Lang LaSalle offered the mall, along with three others, for sale in May 2009. An attempted sale with two other malls failed in 2010.

Shenango Valley Mall made national news due to the closure of both its Macy's and Sears in March 2017. Sears Auto Center was not part of the closure. Firestone and Sears Auto Center were both damaged in the same month by a storm. In 2017, Hermitage City and School District challenged the mall's tax reassessment that significantly reduced its value due to the loss of two anchors. JSMN Shenango Valley Mall defaulted on the mall's $3.430 million loan in February 2018, with courts assigning Metro Commercial as the malls operator. The malls lender, Iowa Square Realty LLC, won it at sheriff's sale for $50,000 in July 2018. Sears Auto Center closed in October 2018.

Court hearings occurred in December 2018 over Iowa Square Realty's ownership of the mall due to issues with maintenance, unpaid rent, and taxes. The mall in December was $243,000 in debt due to unpaid rent and taxes. Ownership of the mall was given to GFM 23 (McConnell family) by the court in January 2019 due to Iowa Square Realty not paying a court ordered $25,000 bond. Issues in early 2019 include the parking lot and a leaky roof. The mall's tax assessment issues were resolved in June 2019. Due to legal issues with JCPenney regarding the redevelopment of the mall, LRC Realty did not complete its purchase of the mall announced in 2019. In February 2022, the malls owner won a common pleas court decision against JCPenney regarding the malls potential redevelopment. JCPenney appealed the case as of August 2022. Shenango Valley Mall was sold to Butterfli Holdings LLC (FLICORE LLC) in August 2022.

Notes

References

External links

Shopping malls in Pennsylvania
Shopping malls established in 1969
1969 establishments in Pennsylvania
Buildings and structures in Mercer County, Pennsylvania
Tourist attractions in Mercer County, Pennsylvania